The 2015 Ritsumeikan Panthers football team represents Ritsumeikan University in the Kansai Collegiate American Football League during the 2015 season. Ritsumeikan plays their home games at Nishikyogoku Athletic Stadium in Kyoto, Japan.

Season

Schedule

Preseason

Regular season

Schedule Sources:

Postseason

Game summaries

Regular season

Kyoto

Momoyama Gakuin

Kobe

Ryukoku

Kansai

Kinki

Kwansei Gakuin

Postseason

Seinan Gakuin (West Japan Championship)

Waseda Big Bears (Koshien Bowl)

Panasonic Impulse (Rice Bowl)

References

External links
 

American football in Japan
2015 in Japanese sport
2015 in American football